The Super Sunday Show may refer to:

 The Bozo Super Sunday Show, a television show from the United States
 The Super Sunday Show, a television show from Australia hosted by the puppet Agro